Erivelton is a given name. It may refer to:

 Erivelto (footballer, born 1954) (Erivélton Martins), Brazilian football midfielder
 Erivelton (footballer, born 1978) (Erivelton Gomes Viana), Brazilian football centre-back
 Erivélton (footballer, born 1983) (Erivélton Aragão), Brazilian football right-back
 Marcos Erivélton Araújo de Farias (born 1992), Brazilian football midfielder for ABC Futebol Clube

See also
 Erivelto (disambiguation)
 Elivelton (disambiguation)